Odontostilbe is a genus of characins from tropical Central and South America, with 17 currently recognized species:
 Odontostilbe dialeptura (W. L. Fink & S. H. Weitzman, 1974)
 Odontostilbe dierythrura Fowler, 1940
 Odontostilbe ecuadorensis Bührnheim & L. R. Malabarba, 2006
 Odontostilbe fugitiva Cope, 1870
 Odontostilbe microcephala C. H. Eigenmann, 1907
 Odontostilbe mitoptera (W. L. Fink & S. H. Weitzman, 1974)
 Odontostilbe nareuda Bührnheim & L. R. Malabarba, 2006

 Odontostilbe pacaasnovos Junior Chuctaya, Willian M. Ohara & L. R. Malabarba, 2020
 Odontostilbe pao Bührnheim & L. R. Malabarba, 2007
 Odontostilbe paraguayensis C. H. Eigenmann & C. H. Kennedy, 1903
 Odontostilbe parecis Bührnheim & L. R. Malabarba, 2006
 Odontostilbe pequira (Steindachner, 1882)
 Odontostilbe pulchra (T. N. Gill, 1858)
 Odontostilbe roloffi Géry, 1972
 Odontostilbe splendida Bührnheim & L. R. Malabarba, 2007
 Odontostilbe stenodon (C. H. Eigenmann, 1915)

References

Characidae